Borso d'Este (1413 – August 20, 1471) was Duke of Ferrara, and the first Duke of Modena, which he ruled from 1450 until his death. He was a member of the House of Este.

Biography
He was an illegitimate son of Niccolò III d'Este, Marquess of Ferrara, Modena and Reggio, and his mistress Stella de' Tolomei. Borso succeeded his brother Leonello d'Este in the marquisate on October 1, 1450.

On May 18, 1452 he received confirmation over his fiefs, as Duke, by Emperor Frederick III. On April 12, 1471, in St. Peter's Basilica, he was also appointed as Duke of Ferrara by Pope Paul II.

Borso followed an expansionist policy for his state, and one of ennobling for his family. He was generally allied with the Republic of Venice, and enemy both to Francesco I Sforza and the Medici family. These rivalries led to the indecisive Battle of Molinella. He was in general appreciated by his subjects. One cause of grievance was his project to build a mountain from scratch in 1471 – a folly he was later forced to abandon.

Borso's court was the center of the so-called Ferrarese school of painting, whose members include Francesco del Cossa, Ercole dei Roberti and Cosimo Tura. Their most important commission during Borso's rule were the frescoes in the Palazzo Schifanoia and the Borso D'Este Bible. He also protected numerous musicians, including Pietrobono del Chitarrino, Niccolò Todesco e Blasio Montolino. 

A man of little education (unlike his brother Leonello), he had a pragmatic view of the arts as a powerful propaganda tool to promote his political ambitions by projecting an image of personal magnificence. He liked to portray himself as an ideal ruler, as for example in the frescoes in Palazzo Schifanoia. His traditional image as a magnanimous patron of arts, as later proclaimed in Ludovico Ariosto's poem Orlando Furioso,  is also an idealized representation. While spending extravagantly on culture and spectacle to promote his political image, he was far from generous with the artists he patronized, whom he did not consider worthy of any special consideration. A notorious example of this attitude was his miserly treatment of Cossa, who consequently abandoned Ferrara for Bologna. His personal Bible (commissioned in 1455) is one of the most magnificent illuminated manuscripts of Renaissance Italy and a fabulously costly work of art; however, its principal illuminator, Taddeo Crivelli, appears to have pawned parts of other manuscripts he was working on to alleviate financial instability.

Borso never married and left no heirs. His successor was his half-brother Ercole I d'Este.

Notes and references
Notes

References

1413 births
1471 deaths
Borso
Margraves of Ferrara
Borso
Borso
Borso
15th-century Italian nobility